Headhunter Records is an American rock music record label distributed by Cargo Music. It was founded in 1989 and is based in San Diego, California.

Notable artists

 Armchair Martian
 Big Drill Car
 Black Heart Procession
 Boys Life
 Creedle
 Deadbolt 
 Drive Like Jehu
 Fishwife
 fluf
 Inch
 Rocket from the Crypt
 Silo the Huskie
 Slap Of Reality
 Smile
 Three Mile Pilot
 Uncle Joe’s Big Ol’ Driver
 Morning Glories

References

External links
 Official site

Record labels established in 1989
American independent record labels
Punk record labels
Post-hardcore record labels
Indie rock record labels